Ichinoki Dam is a concrete gravity dam located in Nara prefecture in Japan. The dam is used for agriculture. The catchment area of the dam is 6.9 km2. The dam impounds about 14  ha of land when full and can store 1570 thousand cubic meters of water. The construction of the dam was started in1974 and completed in 1995.

References

Dams in Nara Prefecture
1995 establishments in Japan